"Bionic/The Law" is the debut single by British glam rock band King Adora. The double a-side single was given a limited release on 8 May 2000 on Superior Quality Recordings and reached number 128 on the UK Singles Chart. Both songs would be re-recorded for the band's 2001 debut album, Vibrate You.

Background

Writing and recording 
Both songs were recorded at Great Linford Manor in Great Linford, Buckinghamshire in early 2000 and were produced and mixed by Chris Sheldon. The Law included drum machine samples, which were credited on the single's sleeve to "Roland".

Themes 
The band explained that Bionic is "about the passionate and cathartic relationship between the band and our audience. The intense connection live. Where everything that hurts and pains everyday doesn't matter any more. Escaping!". The Law is "a tale of seduction and corruption. About getting your leg over with a copper and being caught with your pants down".

Reception 
Melody Maker were overwhelmingly positive, giving the single 4.5/5 and commenting "totally unstoppable and deliriously frenzied".

Track listing

CD 
 "Bionic"
 "The Law"

7"
 "Bionic"
 "The Law"

Personnel
 Matt Browne – vocals, rhythm guitar
 Martyn Nelson – lead guitar
 Robbie Grimmit – bass
 Dan Dabrowski – drums

Production 
 Produced and mixed by Chris Sheldon

References

2000 singles
2000 songs